The First Barr Ministry was the 13th ministry of the Government of the Australian Capital Territory, and was led by Labor Chief Minister Andrew Barr and his deputy Yvette Berry. It was appointed on 15 December 2014 following the resignation of Katy Gallagher as Chief Minister and the subsequent election of Andrew Barr as her replacement by the Australian Capital Territory Legislative Assembly. Green's Shane Rattenbury continued to serve as a minister for the remainder of the parliamentary term, as part of the Labor-Greens parliamentary agreement signed in 2012 at the start of the term.

The ministry was replaced by the Second Barr Ministry in November 2016 after the Labor government's re-election at the 2016 election.

First arrangement
Following Barr's election as Chief Minister, a new ministry was appointed on 15 December 2014 and lasted for one month until 20 January 2015.

Second arrangement
On 20 January 2015, Yvette Berry was appointed to the Ministry, increasing the Ministry size to 6.

Joy Burch controversy
In December 2015, Joy Burch was forced to resign as Minister for Police and Emergency Services, in the wake of allegations that her chief of staff briefed the Construction, Forestry, Maritime, Mining and Energy Union (CFMEU) on matters regarding ACT Policing which are still under investigation. Deputy Chief Minister Simon Corbell replaced Burch as the Minister for Police and Emergency Services.

Third arrangement
Following Joy Burch's resignation as police minister, she resigned from all other ministerial positions a month later in January 2016. A new arrangement was formed, took effect on 22 January 2016 and lasted until the 2016 election in October, with the exception of two ministerial roles. In this arrangement, Meegan Fitzharris and former minister Chris Bourke were appointed to the Ministry, increasing the Ministry size to 7.

Establishment of Transport Canberra and City Services Directorate
On 1 July 2016, with the establishment of Transport Canberra and City Services Directorate (TCCS) as a new directorate, the ministerial positions for Transport and Municipal Services (held by Meegan Fitzharris) and Capital Metro (held by Simon Corbell) were abolished and replaced by Minister for Transport Canberra and City Services (held by Meegan Fitzharris). The arrangement lasted until 31 October 2016 when it was replaced by the Second Barr Ministry following the 2016 election. No other changes to ministerial appointments were made.

The following only includes ministers whose portfolios have changed on 1 July 2016.

References

Australian Capital Territory ministries
Australian Labor Party ministries in the Australian Capital Territory